Şerban is a common name in Romania. It may be phonetically transcribed as Sherban or written without diacritics as Serban.

Persons named Şerban include:

Surname

 Alina Șerban, Roma actress and writer
 Andrei Șerban, Romanian-born American theatre director
 Carmen Şerban,  Romanian country-folk-dance singer
 Chris Serban, Canadian soccer player
 Constantin Şerban, prince of Wallachia (1654–1658)
 Dennis Şerban, Romanian football player
 George Șerban, Romanian journalist, politician and writer
 Mihail Șerban (disambiguation), one of two individuals
 Radu Şerban, prince of Wallachia (1602–1610, 1611)
 Vlad Şerban, Romanian politician

Given name
Șerban Bascovici, Romanian poet
Șerban Cantacuzino, prince of Wallachia (1678-1688)
Șerban Cantacuzino (actor), Romanian actor
Serban Cantacuzino (architect), Romanian architect
Șerban Cioculescu, Romanian literary critic
Șerban Foarță, Romanian writer
Serban Ghenea, Canadian audio engineer and mixer
Șerban Huidu, Romanian television personality
Șerban Iliescu, Romanian linguist and journalist
Șerban Marinescu, Romanian director and screenwriter
Șerban Nichifor, Romanian composer
Șerban Țițeica, Romanian physicist

See also 

 Zherban, a peak in Ukraine known in Romanian as 
 Serban, Çorum
 Shcherban, East Slavic spelling of the surname
 Șerb - a Romanian family name
 Șerbești (disambiguation)
 Șerbăneasa (disambiguation)
 Șerbănești (disambiguation)
 Șerbănescu (surname)

Romanian-language surnames
Romanian masculine given names
Occupational surnames